The Red Bull Racing RB14 was a Formula One racing car designed and constructed by Red Bull Racing to compete during the 2018 FIA Formula One World Championship. The car was driven by Daniel Ricciardo and Max Verstappen, and made its competitive début at the 2018 Australian Grand Prix. Like its predecessors the RB12 and RB13, the RB14 used a Renault engine badged as a TAG Heuer.

Design and development
Where previous cars had been delayed to allow the team more time to develop the chassis in their factory, the team brought the launch of the RB14 forward to gather more on-track data. Team principal Christian Horner justified the decision by revealing that analysis of the team's performances in 2016 and 2017 showed that while the chassis were competitive by the end of the season, the decision to delay their respective launches had resulted in an uncompetitive car at the start of the championship.

The RB14 made its public début in February. Daniel Ricciardo completed a shakedown of the car at the Silverstone Circuit one week before pre-season testing began.

Livery 
Ricciardo and Verstappen competed United States Grand Prix wearing special cowboy styled race suits as a special tribute to Austin and Texas.

Competition history

Opening rounds 

At the opening round in Australia, the car proved to be the third fastest, behind Ferrari and Mercedes. Ricciardo and Verstappen qualified fourth and fifth respectively. Verstappen was seven tenths off pole and Ricciardo nearly a second. Ricciardo received a three-place grid penalty which meant he started 8th. In the race, Verstappen was passed by Kevin Magnussen on the opening lap, while Ricciardo worked his way up on the grid. Verstappen came under pressure from the cars behind him, and as a result spun, dropping him down to P8, while Ricciardo passed him to inherit sixth. The retirement of the Haas cars ahead of them elevated them both two positions. This brought out the safety car, and for the remainder of the race, Ricciardo hounded Ferrari driver Kimi Raikkönen for the final podium place but was unsuccessful and finished in P4. Meanwhile, Verstappen chased McLaren driver Fernando Alonso for fifth place but Alonso managed to hold him off meaning Verstappen finished in sixth place.

The Bahrain Grand Prix proved to be a disaster, with Verstappen starting fifteenth after a crash in Q1, and Ricciardo qualified fifth, this time four tenths off pole. At the start of the race, Ricciardo was overtaken by Toro Rosso driver Pierre Gasly but regained the position at turn 4. Verstappen made great progress in the opening lap. Max Verstappen made contact with Mercedes driver Lewis Hamilton, who had fallen to tenth place. This punctured his left-rear tyre. Ricciardo experienced an electrical shutdown, forcing him to retire. Subsequently, Verstappen also lost drive. This meant a double DNF for Red Bull. This was also the fourth time in five races that Ricciardo had a DNF.

In the Chinese Grand Prix, Red Bull locked out the third row of the grid. In the race, Verstappen managed to overtake Hamilton for fourth, and then Raikonnen a few corners later. This put him in third. As a result of the two cars of Toro Rosso crashing on lap 30, a safety car was brought out. This played very well into the hands of Red Bull, who used the opportunity to pit both cars during the safety car period. Owing to fresher tyres, both Ricciardo and Verstappen began to catch up with the race leaders. On lap 39 Verstappen ran wide trying to overtake Hamilton, losing a position to Ricciardo, who had just overtaken Raikonnen. Both Red Bulls overtook Hamilton. Ricciardo overtook Sebastian Vettel for second place. On lap 43, Verstappen collided with Vettel, resulting in him getting a 10-second penalty. On lap 45, Ricciardo overtook Valtteri Bottas for the lead, and stayed in that position to win the race. Verstappen finished fourth, but dropped back into fifth owing to the penalty.

The Azerbaijan Grand Prix would prove yet to be another disaster. Despite Ricciardo qualifying 4th and Verstappen 5th, Verstappen reported early issues with his engine battery deployment after the lap 6 safety car restart following the first lap crash. However, the pace of the RB14 allowed both drivers to filter through the field after the first round of pitstops back to 4th and 5th, where the two would continue to duel each other and race closely until their own pitstops on lap 35. The main disaster occurred on lap 40. Verstappen, who had just passed Ricciardo due to an overcut during the pitstop, made an extremely late defensive move to the left side of the track to cover an attempted dummy overtake by Ricciardo, which caused a collision between the pair. Both cars were forced to retire and scored no points.

Mid-season

Complete Formula One results
(key) (results in bold indicate pole position; results in italics indicate fastest lap)

 Driver failed to finish the race, but was classified as they had completed over 90% of the race distance.

References

Red Bull Formula One cars
2018 Formula One season cars